This is a filmography for French singer Charles Aznavour. In a career spanning over 70 years, he appeared in more than 60 feature films and was the subject of at least three documentary films.

Feature films
 La Guerre des gosses (1936) … Extra
 Goodbye Darling (1946) (as Aznavour) … Le duettiste
 Entrez dans la danse (1948)
 Une gosse sensass (1957) … Le chanteur
 Paris Music Hall (1957) … Charles
 La Tête contre les murs (1959) … Heurtevent
 Les Dragueurs (1959) … Joseph Bouvier
 Pourquoi viens-tu si tard? (1959) … Un danseur
 Oh! Qué mambo (1959) … Un spectateur au cabaret (uncredited)
 Le Testament d'Orphée (1960) … The curious man (uncredited)
 Tomorrow Is My Turn (Le Passage du Rhin) (1960) … Roger
 Tirez sur le pianiste (1960) … Charlie Kohler/Édouard Saroyan
 Gosse de Paris (1961)
 Taxi for Tobruk (1961) … Samuel Goldmann
 Les Lions sont lâchés (1961) … Charles, un convive de Marie-Laure
  (1962) … Horace Fabiani
 Le Diable et les dix commandements (1962) … Denis Mayeux (episode "Homicide point ne seras")
 Les Quatre vérités (1962) … Charles
 Les Vierges (1963) … Berthet
 Destination Rome (1963) … Marcello
 Cherchez l'Idole (1963) … Aznavour
 Le Rat d'Amérique (1963) … Charles
 Thomas l'imposteur (1964)
 Alta infedeltà (1964) … Giulio (segment "Peccato nel Pomeriggio")
 La Métamorphose des cloportes (1965) … Edmond
 le facteur s'en va-t-en guerre (1966) … Thibon
 Paris au mois d'août (1966) … Henri Plantin
 Darling Caroline (1968) … Postillon
 Candy (1968) … Hunchback juggler
 Le Temps des loups (1969) … Inspector
 The Adventurers (1970) … Marcel Campion
 L'Amour (1970) … Le présentateur
 The Games (1970) … Pavel Vendek
 The Selfish Giant (1971) … Narrator (French version)
 Un beau monstre (1971) … Inspector Leroy
 The Lion's Share (1971) … Éric Chambon
 Les Intrus (1972) … Charles Bernard
 The Blockhouse (1973) … Visconti
 And Then There Were None (1974) … Michel Raven
 Sky Riders (1976) … Insp. Nikolidis
 Folies bourgeoises (1976) … Dr. Lartigue
 The Muppet Show (1977) … Guest appearance
 Die Blechtrommel (1979) … Sigismund Markus
 Ciao, les mecs (1979) … L'amnésique
 The Magic Mountain (1982) … Naphta
 Qu'est-ce qui fait courir David? (1982) … Léon, le père de David
 Les Fantômes du chapelier (1982) … Kachoudas
 Une jeunesse (1983) … Bellun
 Viva la vie! (1984) … Édouard Takvorian
 Yiddish Connection (1986) … Aaron Rapoport
 Mangeclous (1988) … Jérémie
  (1989) … Romualdi
 Le chinois (1989) … Charles Cotrel
 Charles Aznavour Armenia 1989 (1989)
 Les Années campagne (1992) … Grandfather
 Pondichéry, dernier comptoir des Indes (1997) … Léo Bauman
 Le Comédien (1997) … Monsieur Maillard
 Laguna (2001)
 The Truth About Charlie (2002) … Himself
 Ararat (2002) … Edward Saroyan
 Le Père Goriot (2004) … Jean-Joachim Goriot
 Ennemis publics (2005)
 The Colonel (2006) … Père Rossi
 Up (2009) … Carl Fredricksen (French version)

Documentary films
 Charles Aznavour – Armenia 1989 (1989) – About the humanitarian aid that Aznavour brought to his native Armenia after the 1988 Armenian earthquake.
 Christmas in Vienna III (1994) – A Christmas gala concert with Aznavour, Plácido Domingo and Sissel Kyrkjebø, featuring the Vienna Symphony conducted by Croatian conductor Vjekoslav Šutej.
 Making of "Colore Ma Vie" (2007) – A featurette accompanying the release of Aznavour's studio album Colore Ma Vie. Filmed in Havana and Paris, it shows his collaboration with Chucho Valdez.

References

Charles Aznavour
Male actor filmographies
French filmographies